John Charles Arthurs (born August 15, 1947) is an American former professional basketball player.

Arthurs played college basketball for the Tulane University, where he was an All-American in 1969. He scored 1,501 points in three seasons, graduating as Tulane's all-time leading scorer. He also served as a first baseman for Tulane's baseball team. After college, Arthurs was selected by the Milwaukee Bucks in the 6th round (73rd pick overall) of the 1969 NBA Draft. He appeared in 11 games for the Bucks during the 1969–70 NBA season and tallied 35 points.

When his sports career ended, Arthurs entered the real estate business in New Orleans. He was inducted into the Tulane Athletics Hall of Fame in 1980. He is also a member of the Greater New Orleans Sports Hall of Fame and the Louisiana Basketball Hall of Fame.

NBA career statistics

|-
| align="left" | 1969–70
| align="left" | Milwaukee
| 11 || - || 7.8 || .343 || - || .733 || 1.3 || 1.5 || - || - || 3.2
|}

References

1947 births
Living people
American men's basketball players
Basketball players from New Orleans
Guards (basketball)
Milwaukee Bucks draft picks
Milwaukee Bucks players
Tulane Green Wave baseball players
Tulane Green Wave men's basketball players